Aan Aur Shaan is a 1984 Hindi film directed by Ravi Tandon, starring Rishi Kapoor & Moushumi Chatterjee in the lead role. The music was composed by R. D. Burman.

Cast

Shammi Kapoor
Rishi Kapoor
Moushumi Chatterjee
Dara Singh
Nirupa Roy
Farida Jalal
Jeevan (actor) - Sitaram
Ranjeet
Satyen Kappu (Guest Appearance)
Aruna Irani (Guest Appearance)

Soundtrack

References

External links
 

1984 films
1980s Hindi-language films
Films scored by R. D. Burman
Films directed by Ravi Tandon